Hernán Tifner (born 20 September 1996) is an Argentine professional footballer who plays as a midfielder for Mitre.

Career
Tifner had a youth spell with Estudiantes, prior to joining Gimnasia y Esgrima in 2018. His debut in professional league football arrived on 11 August during the club's 2018–19 opener against Argentinos Juniors - he had previously appeared in Copa Argentina fixtures with Sportivo Belgrano on 21 July and Olimpo on 29 July. In July 2019, Tifner departed on loan to Huracán Las Heras of Torneo Federal A. His first match arrived on 1 September against Juventud Unida Universitario, which preceded a further nineteen appearances in all competitions across 2019–20. He returned to Gimnasia in June 2020.

Tifner terminated his contract with Gimnasia in late August 2020, subsequently joining up with former manager Darío Ortiz at Mitre.

Personal life
In February 2019, Tifner was suspended from the professional squad of Gimnasia y Esgrima by manager Pedro Troglio after a complaint of gender violence was made against the player by an ex-girlfriend. He was reintegrated back into the club in the succeeding April. An agreement between him and his former partner was later reached, with Tifner referring to the original incident as "a mistake".

Career statistics
.

References

External links

1996 births
Living people
Footballers from Córdoba, Argentina
Argentine footballers
Argentine people of German descent
Association football midfielders
Argentine Primera División players
Torneo Federal A players
Club de Gimnasia y Esgrima La Plata footballers
Club Atlético Mitre footballers